Luis Portillo (born 29 September 1956) is an Argentine boxer. He competed in the men's light welterweight event at the 1976 Summer Olympics.

References

External links
 

1956 births
Living people
Argentine male boxers
Olympic boxers of Argentina
Boxers at the 1976 Summer Olympics
Place of birth missing (living people)
Light-welterweight boxers